The Faculty of Medicine, Naresuan University is a medical school located in Phitsanulok, Thailand. The first 10 years of establishment was designed based on the cost-effective principle: the Faculty of Medicine responds for academy in pre-clinical years and the Ministry of Public Health hospitals conduct the academic instruction during the clinical years. Thereafter, the Faculty of Medicine will build and develop its own teaching hospital. The faculty's primary teaching hospital is Naresuan University Hospital with six medical education centers cooperation.

History

In 1992, the Cabinet decided that Thailand health system needed more medical doctors especially in upcountry. Naresuan University was included the plan as an active node for the production of doctors. Official agreement between the Ministry of Public Health and Naresuan University was signed on February 18, 1993.

The first batch of 33 medical students started education in 1994 and entered the clinical year at Buddhachinaraj Phitsanulok Hospital Medical Education Center and finally all were graduated in 2001.

The need to produce more medical doctors has been emphasized. The number of medical students in a batch has reached the maximum of 60. In 1999, the Cabinet approved to include Uttaradit Hospital (another Ministry of Public Health hospital), which located in Uttaradit as the second medical education center for Faculty of Medicine Naresuan University. In 2002, 30 clinical students were placed at Uttaradit Hospital.

In 2004, the Cabinet approved a new plan of Naresuan University to include 3 more Ministry of Public Health hospitals as Medical Education Centers (Phrae Hospital in Phrae, Phichit Hospital in Phichit and King Taksin Memorial Hospital in Tak). This time, medical students have been recruited from health personnel (bachelor's degree holders) who are serving at the Ministry of Public Health facilities. In 2005, about 30 clinical medical students were attached to Phrae, Phichit and King Taksin Memorial Hospital.

After the completion of Naresuan University Hospital, a faculty's primary teaching hospital (Renaming from Health Sciences Research Institute Naresuan University in 2005), it is ready for 30 medical students to enter the clinical year in 2007.

Its vision is to be a top medical school with international standards networked throughout the health care community to promote health in Thailand and ASEAN.

Dean

Departments

The faculty of Medicine consists of 15 academic departments.

Programs of study
The Faculty of Medicine is responsible for five programs of study:

Undergraduate program

Doctor of Medicine (MD)
In year 1 of the six-year study, the medical students study the general education courses with other students of the university. In years 2–3, the medical students study the pre-clinical level courses managed by Faculty of Medical Science, Faculty of Pharmaceutical Sciences and Faculty of Medicine. These courses are designed and integrated from the principle of "Problem-Based Learning (PBL)". In years 4–6, or clinical years, the academic instructions are managed primarily by the Naresuan University Hospital, with cooperated resources from affiliated hospitals.

Postgraduate programs

Master of Science (MSc) in Family Medicine
This program is a two-year full-time study focusing on both clinical practise and research of advanced family medicine.

Master of Science (MSc) in Medical Education
This program is also a two-year full-time study which taking in all bachelor's degree holders for the taught courses and individual research thesis on medical education.

Master of Science (MSc) in Health Security Financing and Management
This international program is a two-year part-time study for the highly structured taught courses and the individual independent study related to health security issues.

Doctorate program

Doctor of Philosophy (PhD) in Health Systems and Policy
This international three-year full-time program accepts research students to undertake research to provide evidence at local or national level leading to policy related recommendations.

University Hospital (Primary teaching affiliate)
 Naresuan University Hospital

Medical Education Center (CPIRD-affiliates)
 Buddhachinaraj Phitsanulok Hospital, Phitsanulok
 Phichit Hospital, Phichit
 Phrae Hospital, Phrae
 Somdejphrajaotaksin Maharaj Hospital, Tak
 Uttaradit Hospital, Uttaradit

Address
99 Moo 9, Phitsanulok-Nakhon Sawan Road, Tha Pho, Mueang Phitsanulok, Phitsanulok 65000, Thailand

See also
List of medical schools in Thailand

References

External links
Faculty of Medicine, Naresuan University website
Naresuan University 

Naresuan University
University departments in Thailand
Naresuan University